George Stevens (24 February 1891 – after 1926) was a Scottish footballer who scored 38 goals from 136 appearances in the English Football League playing as a left-sided forward for Darlington and Crewe Alexandra.

Life and career
Stevens was born in Dundee, Scotland, and by 1920, he was playing football for English North Eastern League club Darlington. He scored their second goal as they eliminated Football League First Division club Sheffield Wednesday from the 1919–20 FA Cup in front of a Monday-afternoon crowd of 52,388. The following season, he contributed to Darlington's winning the North Eastern League title, thus ensuring their inclusion in the newly formed Northern Section of the Third Division. Stevens helped Darlington to second place in their first season in the Football League, and went one better three years later, when they gained promotion to the Second Division as champions.

Together with teammate Davie Brown, Stevens was released on a free transfer at the end of the 1925–26 season, and returned to the Third Division with Crewe Alexandra. The Daily Express thought their inclusion "should considerably strengthen the attack". Brown scored heavily for Crewe, but Stevens played only rarely, and finished his league career at the end of that season.

References

1891 births
Year of death missing
Footballers from Dundee
Scottish footballers
Association football forwards
Darlington F.C. players
Crewe Alexandra F.C. players
English Football League players
Place of death missing